Sehqalat (also Romanized as Sehqalāt) is a village in Khonjesht Rural District, in the Central District of Eqlid County, Fars Province, Iran. At the 2006 census, its population was 178, in 41 families.

References 

Populated places in Eqlid County